Scratchology is the second compilation album by New York City DJ group The X-Ecutioners. It was released on April 8, 2003 through Sequence Records. The album contained various hip hop tracks that were cut up and produced by The X-Ecutioners.

History 
Songs from various artists appear on the album, including Grandmaster Flash, 3rd Bass, Public Enemy, Gang Starr, Dilated Peoples, The Beat Junkies, Marvelous Marvin, DJ Premier, Roc Raida, Rhettmatic, and Davy DMX. Additional producers have included DJ Premier, DJ Babu, DJ Q-bert, MC Serch, Pete Nice, Gary G-Wiz and Pete Rock.

Track listing

References

External links 
 The X-Ecutioners at Rolling Stone
 The X-Ecutioners at IGN Music

The X-Ecutioners albums
2003 compilation albums